Gonepteryx farinosa  , the Powdered Brimstone,   is a  butterfly found in the   Palearctic  that belongs to the whites family.

Subspecies
G. f. farinosa Southeast, Asia Minor, Syria, Iran, Transcaucasia, Pamirs-Alai, Himalaya
G. f. turcirana  de Freina, 1983   Caucasus Minor, Armenian Highland
G. f. meridioirana   de Freina, 1983    Kopet-Dagh
G. f. chitralensis   Moore, 1906    Ghissar, Alai, Darvaz, West Pamirs

Description from Seitz

Gonepteryx farinosa from West Asia (the occurrence in North Africa is very doubtful), is conspicuously larger than specimens of G. rhamni from Central Europe or even South France; the scaling of the male is thick, chalky, being lighter above and below on the distal portion of the wings, the whole hindwing, moreover, being somewhat lighter in tint than the forewing; the yellow central spots are more indistinct, being often absent from the forewing, especially in females; the latter still paler than G. rhamni females. The specific distinctness of G. farinosa has often been doubted, as G. farinosa occurs together with G. rhamni and G. cleopatra (for instance in southern Asia Minor).

Biology
The larva feeds on Rhamnus,  Ziziphus , Paliurus

References

Gonepteryx
Butterflies described in 1847